Slade is an unincorporated community in Powell County, Kentucky, United States. Their post office  closed in 2004.

Landmarks
The community is home to the Natural Bridge State Resort Park.

Slade is a popular location for accommodations for climbers of the Red River Gorge. The campground operated by Miguel's Pizza has been called Camp 4 of the East. Slade and the campground were featured in the 2004 documentary movie Red River Ruckus by Victory Productions.

References

Unincorporated communities in Powell County, Kentucky
Unincorporated communities in Kentucky